Dunbog is a parish in the county of Fife in Scotland. The name of the parish derives from the Scottish Gaelic, Dùn Bolg, meaning "bag fort" or "bag-like, rounded hill".  The parish is of entirely rural character, with no actual village - only a collection of farm houses. Dunbog parish is bounded on the north by the River Tay, on the south by Monimail, on the east by Flisk and Creich, and on the west by Abdie. The Barony of Denboig/Dunbog was established in 1687. The nearest town of any size is Newburgh.
It has a small primary school.

In 1577 Jane de la Ramvell, Lady Creich, the mother of Mary Beaton one of the Four Maries who attended Mary Queen of Scots, died at the "Place of Dunbog". Anne of Denmark rode from Falkland Palace and stayed on 20 August 1599.

The remains of Collairnie Castle which belonged to the Barclay family are also in Dunbog parish.

References

Citations

Sources

Parishes in Fife